The Dao language (Daohua) is a Chinese–Tibetan mixed language or creolized language of Yajiang County, Sichuan, China. Word order is SOV as in Tibetan (Yeshes Vodgsal Atshogs 2004:6), while the lexicon consists of words derived from both Chinese and Tibetan.

Distribution
Yeshes Vodgsal Atshogs (2004:6) reports that Dao is spoken in the following townships of Yajiang County, Sichuan, China. Within these administrative townships, Dao is spoken in 8 villages, comprising a total of 504 households and 2,685 individuals as of 1995.
Hekou town 河口镇 (including Mazishi village 麻子石村)
Bajiaolou township 八角楼乡
Xiala township 呷拉乡

Choyo, a Qiangic language, is spoken just to the north of Dao, and is also spoken in Xiala township 呷拉乡.

See also
Wutun language

References

Yeshes Vodgsal Atshogs / Yixiweisa Acuo [意西微萨・阿错]. 2004. A study of Dao [倒话研究]. Beijing: Ethnic Publishing House [民族出版社].

External links
Dao numerals

Chinese-based pidgins and creoles
Languages of China
Mandarin Chinese
Tibetan language
Mixed languages